is a former Japanese football player.

Playing career
Sano was born in Shizuoka Prefecture on April 14, 1968. After graduating from high school, he joined Japan Soccer League club Toyota Motors (later Nagoya Grampus Eight) in 1987. However he could not play many matches. In 1992, Japan Soccer League was folded and founded new league J1 League. He moved to Japan Football League (JFL) club NKK during 1992 season. However he could not play at all in the match and he moved to JFL club Chuo Bohan (later Avispa Fukuoka) in 1993. He became a regular goalkeeper and the club won the champions in 1995 and was promoted to J1. However his opportunity to play decreased behind newcomer Hideki Tsukamoto from 1996. In 1999, he moved to Japan Football League club Sagawa Express Tokyo. However he could not play at all in the match. In 2000, he moved to newly was promoted to J2 League club, Mito HollyHock. However he could not play at all in the match and retired end of 2000 season.

Club statistics

References

External links

1968 births
Living people
Association football people from Shizuoka Prefecture
Japanese footballers
Japan Soccer League players
J1 League players
J2 League players
Japan Football League (1992–1998) players
Japan Football League players
Nagoya Grampus players
NKK SC players
Avispa Fukuoka players
Sagawa Shiga FC players
Mito HollyHock players
Association football goalkeepers